Gulf Medical University (GMU),  established in Ajman, UAE in 1998, is one of the largest private medical universities in the Middle East region.  It has various programs in medicine and health sciences.

Thumbay Moideen is the Founder, President of Board of Trustees of Gulf Medical University. It is owned and promoted by Thumbay Group.

Hossam Hamdy is the Chancellor of GMU.

GMU has six colleges and 26 accredited programs.

History 
 
Gulf Medical University (GMU) is located in the emirate of Ajman, on the western coast of the UAE. 
It was founded in 1998 as Gulf Medical College (GMC) by the Thumbay Group. The college was opened under Decree Number 1, issued on 28 January 1998, by His Highness Sheikh Humaid Bin Rashid Al-Nuaimi, the ruler of Ajman and Member of the Supreme Council, UAE.

The institution became a university in the year 2008 following a Decree by Sheikh Nahyan Bin Mubarak Al Nahyan, Minister of Higher Education and Scientific Research, United Arab Emirates.

Today, the focus of Gulf Medical University has extended into three core areas: Medical Education, Healthcare and Research.

Facilities

Campus 
The Gulf Medical University is located at Thumbay Medicity, in Al Jurf, Ajman  that currently houses the main campus and its support facilities and academic health centers. It has within itself a research center, laboratories, classrooms and administration buildings, a stand-alone building that houses the library and the multimedia centers, a food court, restaurants, coffee shops and a sports complex with courts for tennis, basketball, volleyball and grounds for cricket and football.

Research facility 
The Thumbay Research Institute for Precision Medicine (TRIPM) is an interdisciplinary basic and translational cancer and diabetes research program to meet growing challenges facing UAE health care providers dealing with the increase in cancer burden and diabetes disease. It will focus its activities on comprehensive, translational research and personalised medicine.

Institutes 
 The THUMBAY INSTITUTE OF POPULATION HEALTH focuses on postgraduate studies and research in the fields of public health, Epidemiology, Evidence Based Medicine, Big Data Analysis, Evidence Based Medicine & Policy and Global Health.
 The THUMBAY INSTITUTE OF HEALTH WORKFORCE DEVELOPMENT includes the “Center for Advanced Simulation in Healthcare” (CASH), the “Center for Continuing Education and Community Outreach” (CCE&CO) and the “Center for Health Professions Education and Research” (CHPER). Its main goals is to respond to national, regional and international shortage and need for competent health workforce, “Doctors, Pharmacist, Dentist, Nurses, Paramedics and All Allied Health”.

Virtual Patient Learning (VPL) 
GMU is the first university in the Middle East region to introduce Virtual Patient Learning (VPL).

3D Learning 
GMU is the first medical university in the region to introduce 3D Digital Learning.

Electronic Resource Center

Testing Center 
With a capacity of holding up to 88 participants, GMU is an international center for the MRCP (UK) PACES examination.

Startup Lab 
Helps GMU students and alumni turn their business ideas into reality.

Sports, recreation and socialization 
The campus has the following amenities for students:

 Body & Soul Health Club & Spa
 Blends & Brews Coffee Shoppe
 The Terrace Restaurant
 Mosque

Academic Health System 
The Gulf Medical University Academic Health System (GMUAHS) is the first such initiative in the UAE's private sector. Part of GMUAHS are the Thumbay Hospitals and Thumbay Clinics operated by the healthcare division of Thumbay Group at multiple locations in Dubai, Ajman, Sharjah, Fujairah, Ras Al Khaimah and Umm Al Quwain, as well Thumbay Hospital – Hyderabad. The latest additions to the GMU Academic Health System include Thumbay University Hospital,  Thumbay Dental Hospital and Thumbay Physical Therapy and Rehabilitation Hospital, all within the GMU campus at Thumbay Medicity.

Colleges Under Gulf Medical University

College of Medicine 
Conducts Bachelor of Medicine & Bachelor of Surgery (MBBS) program, Bachelor of Biomedical Sciences (BBMS), Associate Degree in Preclinical Sciences (ADPCS), Masters in Public Health (MPH) program in collaboration with The University of Arizona, USA, Joint Masters in Health Professions Education (JMHPE) Program with FAIMER, USA and the medical internship program.

College of Dentistry 
Conducts three programs: Doctor of Dental Medicine (D.M.D) program, internship program and Master of Dental Surgery (M.D.S) program in Endodontics and Periodontics.

College of Pharmacy 
Conducts two programs: Doctor of Pharmacy (PharmD) entry-to-practice degree program and Master in Clinical Pharmacy (MCP) degree program that offers several areas of specialization including cardiology, infectious diseases, parenteral nutrition, and others. Both programs are accredited by Commission for Academic Accreditation, Ministry of Education, UAE and the PharmD program is under certification by Accreditation Council for Pharmacy Education, USA.

College of Health Sciences 
Conducts programs in Physical Therapy, Medical Laboratory Sciences, Medical Imaging Sciences, as well as Anesthesia Technology.

College of Nursing

College of Healthcare Management and Economics (CoHME) 
Conducts a four years Bachelor of Science in Healthcare Management and Economics and a 3 Semesters Executives Master in Healthcare Management and Economics.

Events and activities

GMU Annual Sports Festival 
The week-long inter-university sports festival hosted by GMU annually is the biggest sporting event of its kind in the country.

‘Future Scientists of the UAE’ Initiative 
Launched by GMU in collaboration with GEMS International Schools, students are selected from grades 9 to 12 from various schools under GEMS, through a competitive admission process. These future scientists are mentored by research scientists, professors and clinical staff at Gulf Medical University. GMU's world-class research facility, The Thumbay Research Institute for Precision Medicine - plays a central role in the program.

Global Alumni Summit 
Held biennially, the ‘GMU Global Alumni Summit’ organized by the GMU Students Affairs Department recognizes the most outstanding accomplishments of its alumni.

Student Council Executive Board
Elected representatives from the Student Council form the Student Council Executive Board. This is made up of one elected student from each program who will attend the respective college council meetings called for by the deans of the respective colleges.

A General Secretary is elected from amongst the council's executive board along with a few Joint Secretaries on an annual basis. 
The institute hails its elected officials by placing their names on the university boards main entrance hall.

Thumbay Medicity 
Gulf Medical University is located in Thumbay Medicity, Ajman, the regional hub of medical education, healthcare and research. The Medicity occupies  and can serve up to 20,000 people daily

References

Universities and colleges in the Emirate of Ajman
Medical schools in the United Arab Emirates
Educational institutions established in 1998
1998 establishments in the United Arab Emirates